This list of nuclear holocaust fiction lists the many works of speculative fiction that attempt to describe a world during or after a massive nuclear war, nuclear holocaust, or crash of civilization due to a nuclear electromagnetic pulse.

Films

Television programs
 A Carol for Another Christmas (ABC, 1964), Rod Serling TV film
 A Day Called 'X' (CBS, 1957)
 Adventure Time (Cartoon Network, 2010–2018)
 American Horror Story: Apocalypse (FX, 2018)
 Battlestar Galactica (Sci-Fi, 2003, 2004–2009)
 Buck Rogers in the 25th Century (NBC, 1979)
 By Dawn's Early Light (HBO, 1990)
 Countdown to Looking Glass (HBO, 1984)
 Dark Angel (Fox, 2000–2002)
 Der Dritte Weltkrieg (ZDF, 1998)
 Fail Safe (CBS, 2000)
 Genesis II (CBS, 1973)
 Jericho (CBS, 2006–2008)
 Level Seven (BBC, 1966), adapted by J. B. Priestley for Out of the Unknown
 On the Beach (Showtime, 2000)
 Planet Earth (ABC, 1974)
 Special Bulletin (NBC, 1983)
 Terminator: The Sarah Connor Chronicles (Fox, 2008–2009)
 Testament (PBS, 1983)
 The 100 (The CW, 2014–2020)
 The Day After (ABC, 1983)
 The Martian Chronicles miniseries (NBC, 1980)
 The War Game (BBC, 1965)
 Threads (BBC, 1984)
 Whoops Apocalypse (ITV, 1982)
 Woops! (Fox, 1992)
 World War III miniseries (NBC, 1982)

Television episodes
 The Motorola Television Hour: "Atomic Attack" (1954 ABC-TV series Season 1, Episode 15) – A family living 50 miles away try to flee from the fallout of an hydrogen bomb that fell on New York City. Based on the novel Shadow on the Hearth (1950) by Judith Merrill.
 The Twilight Zone: "Time Enough at Last" (1959)
 Playhouse 90:  "Alas, Babylon" (1960)
 The Twilight Zone: "The Old Man in the Cave" (1963)
 Star Trek: "Space Seed" (1967)
 Star Trek: "Assignment: Earth" (1968) – The crew goes back in time to find out how the human race was able to survive the Cold War. 
 The Twilight Zone: "A Little Peace and Quiet" (1985)
 The Twilight Zone: "Quarantine" (1986)
 The Twilight Zone: "Shelter Skelter" (1987)
The Outer Limits: "Bits of Love" (1997)
The Outer Limits: "The Human Factor" (2002)
 The Twilight Zone: "Chosen" (2002)
 Masters of Science Fiction: "A Clean Escape" (2007)
 What If...?: What If... Ultron Won?" (2021)
 A few episodes of Star Trek: Enterprise depict both humans and Vulcans as being close to extermination caused by nuclear war.

Novels
 After The Bomb by Gloria D. Miklowitz
 Alas, Babylon by Pat Frank
 Amnesia Moon by Jonathan Lethem (regarding Hatfork)
 Ape and Essence by Aldous Huxley
 Arc Light by Eric Harry
 Armageddon's Children By Terry Brooks (2006) (Genesis of Shannara Trilogy book 1)
 The Ashes Series by William W. Johnstone
 The Beast of Heaven by Victor Kelleher
 Brother in the Land by Robert Swindells
 A Canticle for Leibowitz by Walter M. Miller, Jr. (1960)
 Children of the Dust by Louise Lawrence
 The Chrysalids by John Wyndham
 Commander-1 by Peter George
 Damnation Alley by Roger Zelazny
 Dark December by Alfred Coppel
 Dark Mirrors (original title) Schwarze Spiegel by Arno Schmidt
 Davy and other works by Edgar Pangborn
 The Day They H-Bombed Los Angeles by Robert Moore Williams
 Deathlands series by a variety of authors writing under the pen name James Axler
 Dr. Bloodmoney, or How We Got Along After the Bomb by Philip K. Dick
 Do Androids Dream of Electric Sheep? by Philip K. Dick
 Domain by James Herbert
 Doomday Wing by George H. Smith
 Doomsday Plus Twelve by James D. Forman
 Down to a Sunless Sea by David Graham
 Earthwreck! by Thomas N. Scortia
 The Eclipse Trilogy by John Shirley
 The Egghead Republic by Arno Schmidt
 Einstein's Monsters by Martin Amis
 End of the World by Dean Owen (novelization of the film Panic in Year Zero!)
 Ende: A Diary of the Third World War by Anton-Andreas Guha
 Endworld series by David Robbins
 Eon by Greg Bear
 The Erthing Cycle by Wayland Drew
 Fahrenheit 451 by Ray Bradbury
 Farnham's Freehold by Robert A. Heinlein
 Fire Brats by Scott Siegel and Barbara Siegel
 First Angel by Ed Mann, published by Soldier of Fortune magazine
 Fiskadoro by Denis Johnson
 Free Flight by Douglas Terman
 The Gate to Women's Country by Sheri S. Tepper
 A Gift Upon the Shore by M. K. Wren
 God's Grace by Bernard Malamud
 The Guardians series by Richard Austin
 The Hot War series by Harry Turtledove
 The Hunger Games by Suzanne Collins
 The Iron Dream by Norman Spinrad
  Jenny, My Diary by Yorick Blumenfeld
  Domain by James Herbert
 The Last Children of Schewenborn by Gudrun Pausewang
 The Last Ship by William Brinkley
 The Last War, a 1986 novel by Martyn Godfrey
 Level 7 by Mordecai Roshwald
 The Long Loud Silence by Wilson Tucker
 The Long Tomorrow by Leigh Brackett
 Long Voyage Back by George Cockcroft, under the pen name Luke Rhinehart, 1983
 Malevil by Robert Merle
 The Martian Chronicles by Ray Bradbury
 Metro 2033 by Dmitry Glukhovsky
 The Metrozone Series by Simon Morden
 Nineteen Eighty-Four by George Orwell 
 Not This August by C.M. Kornbluth
 Obernewtyn and subsequent novels in the series by Isobelle Carmody
 On the Beach by Nevil Shute
 One Second After by William R. Forstchen
 The Outward Urge, by John Wyndham and Lucas Parkes
 The Pelbar Cycle Book One (Beyond Armageddon) by Paul O. Williams
 Plan of Attack, a 2004 thriller by Dale Brown
 The Postman, a 1985 post-apocalyptic novel by David Brin
 Prayers for the Assassin, by Robert Ferrigno
 Prime Directive, by Judith and Garfield Reeves-Stevens; a Star Trek novel where an alien civilization is apparently destroyed by a sudden, unexpected nuclear war among its own people
 Pulling Through, by Dean Ing; first half of the book is a novel on a family surviving a nuclear blast, the second half is a non-fiction survival guide
 Red Alert, by Peter George
 Resurrection Day by Brendan DuBois
 Riddley Walker by Russell Hoban
 The School for Atheists by Arno Schmidt
 Second Ending, by James White
 The Seventh Day by Hans Hellmut Kirst (original title Keiner Kommt Davon)
 Shadow on the Hearth by Judith Merril (1950) – a novel about a traditional housewife's ordeals in the aftermath of nuclear attack
 The Silo Series by Hugh Howey (2011) – A nuclear exchange is used to cover up a nano-bot attack.
 Single Combat by Dean Ing (second in the Ted Quantril trilogy)
 A Small Armageddon by Mordecai Roshwald
 Star Man's Son by Andre Norton (1952) – a post-apocalyptic novel that takes place about two centuries after the Great-Blowup. It is titled Daybreak – 2250 AD in reprint editions.
 The Steel, the Mist, and the Blazing Sun by Christopher Anvil
 The Survivalist by Jerry Ahern
 Swan Song by Robert McCammon
 Systemic Shock by Dean Ing (first in the Ted Quantril trilogy)
 Tengu (Novel) by Graham Masterton
 Test of Fire by Ben Bova
 There Will Be Time by Poul Anderson
 This Is the Way the World Ends by James Morrow
 This Time Tomorrow by Lauran Paine
 Time Capsule by Mitch Berman
 Tomorrow! by Philip Wylie
 Trinity's Child by William Prochnau (1983)
 Triumph by Philip Wylie
 The Valley-Westside War by Harry Turtledove
 Vaneglory by George Turner
 Viper Three by Walter Wager
 Warday by Whitley Strieber and James Kunetka
 When the Wind Blows by Raymond Briggs
 Wild Country by Dean Ing (Third in the Ted Quantril Trilogy)
 The Wild Shore by Kim Stanley Robinson
 The World Next Door by Brad Ferguson
 The World Set Free by H. G. Wells
 Worldwar series by Harry Turtledove – alternate history: World War II turns nuclear in 1943; another nuclear war in the 1960s
 Z for Zachariah by Robert C. O'Brien

Short stories
 "The Blast" by Stuart Cloete (1947), published in 6 Great Short Novels of Science Fiction, ed. Groff Conklin, 1954
 "Thunder and Roses" (1947) by Theodore Sturgeon 
 "Not with a Bang" (1949) by Damon Knight
 "The Last Word" (1956) by Damon Knight
 "A Clean Escape" (1985) by John Kessel
 "The 16th October 1985" (2009) by James Plumridge
 "The Edge of the Knife" (1957) by H. Beam Piper
 "Lot" (1953) and "Lot's Daughter" (1954) by Ward Moore (inspiration for the film Panic in Year Zero!)
 "There Will Come Soft Rains" by Ray Bradbury (1950)
 "Preview of the War We Do Not Want", published in Collier's Magazine (1951)
 "If I Forget Thee, Oh Earth" by Arthur C. Clarke – featuring a boy living in a colony on the moon, left isolated by the destruction of the Earth
 "A Boy and His Dog" by Harlan Ellison (1969)
 "Fermi and Frost" by Frederik Pohl (1985)
 "Tight Little Stitches in a Dead Man's Back" by Joe R. Lansdale (1986)
 "The Custodians" by Richard Cowper
 "Summer Thunder" by Stephen King
 "By the Waters of Babylon" by Stephen Vincent Benet (1937)
 "100 days in nuclear war" by The Infographics Show

Short story collections
 Countdown To Midnight, 1984, edited by H. Bruce Franklin
 Beyond Armageddon, 1985, edited by Walter M. Miller, Jr. and Martin Harry Greenberg
 Nuclear War, 1988, edited by Gregory Benford and Martin Harry Greenberg
 The Folk of the Fringe, 1989, Orson Scott Card

Comics
2000AD/Judge Dredd, set in a post-war Earth where the majority of the United States is called the "Cursed Earth"
 Akira features Tokyo after a nuclear conflict.
 AXA, set in the aftermath of a nuclear- and biological war with heroine AXA fighting against evil
 Barefoot Gen, Japanese manga about life after the Hiroshima bombing
Cobalt 60 by Vaughn Bodē, Mark Bodē and Larry Todd, set in a post-apocalyptic world
 Fist of the North Star, a Japanese comic franchise set in a post-nuclear Earth
 Nausicaä of the Valley of the Wind, a Japanese graphic novel, later partly adapted in film, set in a far, post-apocalyptic future, rife with themes of bioethics, environmentalism, genetics and psionics
 The Punisher: The End, a one-shot issue of Marvel Comic's Punisher by Garth Ennis and Richard Corben
 Strontium Dog, set in a post-nuclear war earth where many humans have been deformed by the radiation and are branded as "mutants"
 V for Vendetta by Alan Moore and David Lloyd, is set in an England which has survived through a nuclear war which devastated the majority of the rest of the world.

Animation shorts
 The Big Snit (National Film Board of Canada, Richard Condie; 1985)
 The Hole, 1962, featuring the voice of Dizzy Gillespie
 A Short Vision, 1956
 Pika-Don (1978)

Music

 "1983... (A Merman I Should Turn to Be)" by Jimi Hendrix
 "1999" by Prince, from the album 1999
 "2 Minutes to Midnight" by Iron Maiden, on the subject of the Cold War
 "540,000 Degrees Fahrenheit" by Fear Factory
 "99 Luftballons" by Nena
 "Aftermath" by Armored Saint
 "Aftershock" by Anthrax
 "April 2031" by Warrant
 "Arise" by Sepultura
 "Beneath the Remains" by Sepultura
 "Bomb" by Gang Green
 "Boom!" by System of a Down on the album Steal This Album!
 "Breathing" by Kate Bush, the final track off her third album, Never For Ever
 "Bring Back the Bomb" by GWAR
 "Christmas at Ground Zero" by "Weird Al" Yankovic
 "Dancing with Tears in My Eyes" by Ultravox
 "Destruction Preventer" by Sonata Arctica
 "Distant Early Warning" by Rush
 "Downer" by Nirvana
 "Domino" by Genesis, from Invisible Touch, about the effect of dropping the bomb
 "Eve of Destruction" by Barry McGuire
 "Fabulous Disaster" by Exodus
 "Fight Fire with Fire" by Metallica, the first song off their second album, Ride the Lightning
 "Ground Zero Brooklyn" by Carnivore
 "In the Hole" by Armored Saint
 "Killer of Giants" by Ozzy Osbourne
 "King of the World" by Steely Dan, from the album Countdown to Ecstasy
 "London Calling" by The Clash
 "M.A.D." by Hadouken!; lyrics and title refer to nuclear war; the whole album's and lyrics refer to atomic war
 "Morning Dew" by Bonnie Dobson; also recorded by Jeff Beck, Blackfoot, Einstürzende Neubauten, Tim Rose, and The Grateful Dead
 "One of the Living" by Tina Turner, from Mad Max Beyond Thunderdome
 Pink World by Planet P Project
 "Pronto viviremos en la Luna" (Soon we will be living at the Moon), by Spanish singer-songwriter Víctor Manuel.
 "Put Down That Weapon" by Midnight Oil
"Rust in Peace... Polaris" by Megadeth
 "Seconds" by U2
"Set the World Afire" by Megadeth
"Shattered" by Pantera
 "Skeletons of Society" by Slayer
 "Talkin' World War III Blues" by Bob Dylan
 "Thank God for the Bomb" by Ozzy Osbourne
 "Survive" by Nuclear Assault
 "Two Suns in the Sunset" by Pink Floyd from the album The Final Cut
 "Two Tribes" by Frankie Goes to Hollywood
 "Warhead" by Tarot
 "We Will All Go Together When We Go" by Tom Lehrer
 "We Will Become Silhouettes" by The Postal Service
 "Will The Sun Rise?" by Dokken
 "Wooden Ships" recorded by both Crosby, Stills & Nash and Jefferson Airplane
 "World War III" recorded by D.O.A.
 "World Wars III & IV" by Carnivore

Games

See also
 Nuclear holocaust
 Nuclear weapons in popular culture
 World War III in popular culture
 List of apocalyptic and post-apocalyptic fiction
 Apocalyptic and post-apocalyptic fiction
 List of books about nuclear issues
 List of films about nuclear issues
 List of apocalyptic films
 List of dystopian films

References

External links
 Nuclear Holocausts: Atomic War in Fiction, By Paul Brians, Professor of English, Washington State University, Pullman, Washington
 Annotated bibliography of nuclear literature from the Alsos Digital Library